Rajesh Kumar Singh also known as Rajesh Singh Kushwaha is a Member of Legislative Assembly for Bihar Legislative Assembly from the Hathua Assembly constituency in Gopalganj district. Singh was elected to the Assembly in 2020 Assembly elections by defeating Ram Sewak Singh of Janata Dal (United), by a margin of more than 30,000 votes. He was elected as a candidate of Rashtriya Janata Dal.

See also
 Ram Lakhan Mahato
 Sunil Kumar Kushwaha

References

Rashtriya Janata Dal politicians
Bihar MLAs 2020–2025
People from Gopalganj district, India
Living people
Year of birth missing (living people)